In applied mathematics, the nonuniform discrete Fourier transform (NUDFT or NDFT) of a signal is a type of Fourier transform, related to a discrete Fourier transform or discrete-time Fourier transform, but in which the input signal is not sampled at equally spaced points or frequencies (or both). It is a generalization of the shifted DFT. It has important applications in signal processing, magnetic resonance imaging, and the numerical solution of partial differential equations.

As a generalized approach for nonuniform sampling, the NUDFT allows one to obtain frequency domain information of a finite length signal at any frequency. One of the reasons to adopt the NUDFT is that many signals have their energy distributed nonuniformly in the frequency domain. Therefore, a nonuniform sampling scheme could be more convenient and useful in many digital signal processing applications. For example, the NUDFT provides a variable spectral resolution controlled by the user.

Definition
The nonuniform discrete Fourier transform transforms a sequence of  complex numbers  into another sequence of complex numbers  defined by

There are three types of NUDFTs.

 The nonuniform discrete Fourier transform of type I (NUDFT-I) uses uniform sample points  but nonuniform (i.e. non-integer) frequencies . This corresponds to evaluating a generalized Fourier series at equispaced points. It is also known as NDFT.
 The nonuniform discrete Fourier transform of type II (NUDFT-II) uses uniform (i.e. integer) frequencies  but nonuniform sample points . This corresponds to evaluating a Fourier series at nonequispaced points. It is also known as adjoint NDFT.
 The nonuniform discrete Fourier transform of type III (NUDFT-III) uses both nonuniform sample points  and nonuniform frequencies . This corresponds to evaluating a generalized Fourier series at nonequispaced points. It is also known as NNDFT.

Unlike in the uniform case, however, this substitution is unrelated to the inverse Fourier transform.
The inversion of the NUDFT is a separate problem, discussed below.

Multidimensional NUDFT
The multidimensional NUDFT converts a -dimensional array of complex numbers  into another -dimensional array of complex numbers  defined by

The multidimensional NUDFTs of types I, II, and III are defined analogously to the 1D case.

Relationship to Z-transform
The NUDFT-I can be expressed as a Z-transform. The NUDFT-I of a sequence  of length  is

Note that the NUDFT reduces to the DFT when the sampling points are located on the unit circle at equally spaced angles.

Expressing the above as a matrix, we get

where

Direct inversion of the NUDFT-I
If we further factorize , we can see that  is nonsingular provided the   points are distinct. If  is nonsingular, we can get a unique inverse NUDFT-I as follows:
.

To solve this problem more efficiently, we first determine  directly by polynomial interpolation:
.

Then  are the coefficients of the above interpolating polynomial.

Expressing  as the Lagrange polynomial of order , we get

where  are the fundamental polynomials:

.

Expressing  by the Newton interpolation method, we get

The disadvantage of the Lagrange representation is that any additional point included will increase the order of the interpolating polynomial, leading to the need to recompute all the fundamental polynomials. However, any additional point included in the Newton representation only requires the addition of one more term.

We can use a lower triangular system to solve :

where

By the above equation,  can be computed within  operations. In this way Newton interpolation is more efficient than Lagrange Interpolation unless the latter is modified by
.

Nonuniform fast Fourier transform
While a naive application of equation results in an  algorithm for computing the NUDFT,  algorithms based on the fast Fourier transform (FFT) do exist. Such algorithms are referred to as NUFFTs or NFFTs and have been developed based on oversampling and interpolation, min-max interpolation, and low-rank approximation. In general, NUFFTs leverage the FFT by converting the nonuniform problem into a uniform problem (or a sequence of uniform problems) to which the FFT can be applied. Software libraries for performing NUFFTs are available in 1D, 2D, and 3D.

Applications
The applications of the NUDFT include:
 Digital signal processing
 Magnetic resonance imaging
 Numerical partial differential equations
 Semi-Lagrangian schemes
 Spectral methods
 Spectral analysis
 Digital filter design
 Antenna array design
 Detection and decoding of dual-tone multi-frequency (DTMF) signals

See also
 Discrete Fourier transform
 Fast Fourier transform
 Least-squares spectral analysis
 Lomb–Scargle periodogram
 Spectral estimation
 Unevenly spaced time series

References

External links
 Non-Uniform Fourier Transform: A Tutorial.
 NFFT 3.0 – Tutorial
 NUFFT software library

Fourier analysis
Transforms
Digital signal processing